Rudraram is a village and panchayat in Sangareddy district, TS, India. It falls under Patancheru mandal.

References

Villages in Sangareddy district